Edmond Jules Isidore Leburton (18 April 1915 – 15 June 1997) was a Belgian politician who served as the prime minister of Belgium from 1973 to 1974.

He first entered Parliament representing Huy, Belgium.

Prime Minister of Belgium

Leburton served as the Prime Minister of Belgium from January 1973 to April 1974. A number of reforms were carried out under Leburton's government, including a law on 'prolonged minority' (June 1973) to safeguard people with mental disabilities, the introduction of annual adjustments to pensions to the level of economic prosperity (March 1973), and the passage of an Act which strengthened the rights of tenants (November 1973). In addition, improvements were made to various social welfare benefits. He was the last native French speaker to hold that office, disregarding the bilingual Paul Vanden Boeynants from Brussels, until Elio Di Rupo took office in December 2011. He was a member of the Socialist Party. Leburton was also the last member of that party to hold the office of Prime Minister until Elio Di Rupo.

Personal life
On 20 December 1947, Leburton married Charlotte (Joniaux) (born 20 August 1922) and had two sons, Jean-Pierre (born 4 March 1949), and Eddy (born 28 July 1951).
He died on 15 June 1997 in Waremme, aged 82.

Honours 
The list of all Honours is published on the carte de Deuil, 1997.

  : Minister of State, by Royal Decree.
  : Grand Cordon in the Order of Leopold, by Royal Decree of 16.04.1977.
  : Grand Cross in the Order of Leopold II.
  : Croix de Guerre.
 Knight Grand Cross in the Order of Merit of the Italian Republic
 Knight Grand Cross in the Order of Orange-Nassau.
 Knight Grand Cross in the Order of the Oak Crown.
 Knight Grand Cross in the Order of the Aztec Eagle.
 Knight Grand Cross in the Order of Isabella the Catholic.
 Knight Grand Cross in the Order of King Abdul Aziz.
 Grand Officer in the Legion of Honour

See also
 Politics of Belgium

References

Growth to Limits. The Western European Welfare States Since World War II by Peter Flora
http://aei.pitt.edu/9801/1/9801.pdf
https://web.archive.org/web/20160303203621/http://www.pomonaproject.org/Annex_VIII2_Belgium_Report.pdf

External links
Obituary

|-

1915 births
1997 deaths
People from Waremme
Belgian Socialist Party politicians
Prime Ministers of Belgium
Presidents of the Chamber of Representatives (Belgium)

Belgian Ministers of State
Recipients of the Grand Cross of the Order of Leopold II
Grand Crosses 1st class of the Order of Merit of the Federal Republic of Germany
Knights Grand Cross of the Order of Orange-Nassau
Knights Grand Cross of the Order of Merit of the Italian Republic
Knights Grand Cross of the Order of Isabella the Catholic